Lignum is an unincorporated community in Culpeper County, Virginia, United States. Lignum has a post office with ZIP code 22726, which opened on November 14, 1877.

References

Unincorporated communities in Culpeper County, Virginia
Unincorporated communities in Virginia